John Louis Coffey (April 15, 1922 – November 10, 2012) was a justice of the Wisconsin Supreme Court and later a United States circuit judge of the United States Court of Appeals for the Seventh Circuit.

Education and career
Coffey was born in Milwaukee, Wisconsin and graduated from the Marquette University High School in 1939. Coffey received a Bachelor of Arts degree from Marquette University in 1943 and was in the United States Navy during World War II, from 1943 to 1946. He received a Juris Doctor from Marquette University Law School in 1948. He was an assistant city attorney for the city of Milwaukee from 1949 to 1954.

He was a judge for Milwaukee County, Wisconsin, first as a Civil Court judge from 1954 to 1960, then a Municipal Court judge from 1960 to 1962, and then as a Circuit Court judge, Milwaukee County, Wisconsin from 1962 to 1978. He was the senior judge of the Criminal Division from 1972 to 1975, and chief presiding judge of the Criminal Division in 1976, switching to the civil division from 1976 to 1978. He was a justice of the Wisconsin Supreme Court from 1978 to 1982.

Federal judicial service

On February 19, 1982, Coffey was nominated by President Ronald Reagan to a seat on the United States Court of Appeals for the Seventh Circuit vacated by Judge Thomas E. Fairchild. Coffey was confirmed by the United States Senate on March 18, 1982, and received his commission the following day. He assumed senior status on July 2, 2004, and took inactive senior status on January 1, 2012. He died, aged 90, on November 10, 2012.

Notes

Sources
FJC Bio

External links

John Coffey, Wisconsin Historical Society

1922 births
2012 deaths
Judges of the United States Court of Appeals for the Seventh Circuit
Marquette University alumni
Marquette University Law School alumni
Military personnel from Milwaukee
Lawyers from Milwaukee
United States court of appeals judges appointed by Ronald Reagan
20th-century American judges
United States Navy personnel of World War II
Wisconsin state court judges
Justices of the Wisconsin Supreme Court
Marquette University High School alumni